{|

{{Infobox ship characteristics
|Hide header=
|Header caption= 
|Ship type=Protected cruiser
|Ship displacement=11,000 tons<ref name=Con>Conway's, 1860–1905</ref>
|Ship length=*
( o/a)
|Ship beam=
|Ship height=
|Ship draught=*

|Ship draft=
|Ship power=
|Ship propulsion=*2 shaft triple expansion engines:

(Ariadne, Spartiate,)
Belleville boilers
|Ship speed=*
(Ariadne, Spartiate,)
|Ship range=* at 
(bunker capacity 1900 tons)Brassey's (p.220-233) quotes a coal capacity of 1,000 tons.
|Ship endurance=
|Ship complement=677
|Ship sensors=
|Ship EW=
|Ship armament=
16 × single QF  gunsJanes Fighting Ships 1900 claimed on page 108 that the Diadems had 6-in 45 calibre guns. The 6-in BL Mk VII was 45 calibres. This was later corrected in subsequent editions to the 40 calibre QF guns
14 × single 12-pounder (76 mm) QF guns
3 × single QF 3-pounder (47 mm) guns
2 × 18-inch (450 mm) torpedo tubes (underwater)
8 Maxim machine guns
|Ship armour=*Casemates and gun shields 
Hoists 
Deck 
Conning tower  fore 
 tube to fore conning tower
 aft conning tower
Armour was Harvey Nickel steel, except for armoured deck.
|Ship armor=
|Ship aircraft=
|Ship aircraft facilities=
|Ship notes=
}}
|}

The 'Diadem-class cruiser was a class of "first class" protected cruiser built for the Royal Navy during the 1890s that served in the First World War. The class consisted of eight ships, built at a cost of around £600,000 each.

They were considered "good sea boats" but criticised for their lack of a heavy calibre main armament, bulky unprotected sides, average speed and lack of manoeuvrability despite being considered large ships when completed. They were the last British first class protected cruisers; the armoured cruiser taking the large cruiser role in future."

 Design 

The Diadems were designed by Sir William White, and are typical of British design practice of the period, with high freeboard (by the standards of the time) and the use of 'double-decker' casemates, with the hull forward and aft cut away to allow fore and aft fire from the casemate guns. Casemates provided protection for the guns and allowed a large number of guns to bear on the broadside; however, the lower (main deck) guns were almost unusable in heavy seas.

According to a contemporary (1900) edition of Jane's Fighting Ships the hulls were wood sheathed and coppered. and "There are coal bunkers on the lower deck, and above and below the armour deck. The pair of 6 in guns forward and aft are served by one hoist to the pair, each casemate has its own hoist: those to the double casemates being double. The machinery weighs 1630 tons: the boilers occupy a space of about 132 feet (40 m). Working pressure is [300 to 250 psi (2.1 to 1.7 MPa)]. "The ships are almost absolutely identical in appearance. The Diadem and Andromeda have no steam pipes abaft the first two funnels, while all the others have steam pipes before and abaft each funnel."

 History 
The Diadem class was intended, like the preceding , for trade protection, and were intended to be "capable of dealing with any cruiser existing or building". The Powerfuls had proved costly and demanding in manpower, and the new class had to represent a more economical solution, that could be built and operated in greater numbers. These changes saved about £100,000 per ship (approximately 15%) relative to the Powerful design.

With eight ships, each of 11,000 tons and costing £600,000, the Diadems were an important class. However, they proved controversial. The naval journalist Fred Jane characterised them as "much-discussed" and complained that "all the weak points of the Powerfuls were exaggerated in them". In particular, contemporary critics raised  objections to their indifferent speed, poor manoeuvrability, and lack of heavy guns, and the fact that, while most of the armament was well protected in casemates, the fore and aft pairs of guns, which commanded the greatest fields of fire, were protected only by gunshields.

Although the powerplant used Belleville boilers, which were of the then-new water-tube type, most of the ships enjoyed the reputation of good steamers; the exception was Niobe, whose engines gave persistent trouble. The first four ships were troubled by vibration; to remedy this, the engine rooms of the last four were rearranged; the new configuration also provided a  increase in power. All eight ships exceeded their design power on trials; the first four averaged  in service, the later four .

In general the Diadems served most of their careers in home waters, although there were some deployments to China Station, the Mediterranean and the Caribbean. Niobe was sold to Canada in 1910. After 1906, they were only occasionally in commission, and by 1914 the class had for the most part been relegated to training ship and depot ship duties. However, with the outbreak of the First World War, several of them were reactivated, initially for patrol duties with the 9th Cruiser Squadron in the Eastern Atlantic. In 1917 Amphitrite and Ariadne were converted into minelayers, for service with the Dover Patrol. Ariadne was the only war loss, being torpedoed by the German submarine  on 26 July 1917. By the end of the war the survivors had again been withdrawn from active service, and all of them had been sold for scrap by 1932, with the exception of  Andromeda, which served as a boys’ training ship until 1956.

 Building Programme 
Standard British practice at that time was for building costs to exclude' armament and stores.

Notes

Citations 

 References 
 Brown, David K. Warrior to Dreadnought: Warship Development 1860–1905. Caxton Editions 2003. 
 Chesnau, Roger and Kolesnik, Eugene (Ed.) Conway's All the World's Fighting Ships 1860–1905. Conway Maritime Press, 1979. 
 Robert Gardiner (Ed.). Conway's All the World's Fighting Ships 1906–1921. Conway Maritime Press, 1985. 
 worldwar1.co.uk
 Jane, Fred T (Ed.) Jane's Fighting Ships 1900
 Jane, Fred T (Ed. Preston, Anthony). The British Battle-Fleet: Its Inception and Growth throughout the Centuries''.  Republished by Conway Maritime Press, 1997. .
 Brassey, T.A. (ed)The Naval Annual 1904
 Brassey, T.A. (ed)The Naval Annual 1905
 Leyland, J. and Brassey, T.A. (ed)The Naval Annual 1906
 Hythe, Viscount and Leyland, J. (ed)The Naval Annual 1914

External links 

Cruiser classes
 
Ship classes of the Royal Navy